Khijadiya is a village and railway station in Bagasara Taluka, Amreli District, Gujarat State . Khijadiya is located 31.3 km distance from its district headquarters town of Amreli.

Khijadiya is also a railway junction station and connects to Dhari, Junagadh and Dhasa junctions. The station code is KJV.

References

Villages in Amreli district